Lamine Diarrassouba  (born 1 January 1986) is an Ivorian former professional footballer who played as a striker.

Career
Diarrassaouba joined Politehnica Iaşi Egyptian club Al-Sekka Al-Hadid. He left Romania in January 2009, but re-signed after failed trials on 25 March 2009 on new contract with Politehnica Iaşi. Following the dissolution of Politehnica, he moved to FC Brașov, where he played for a half of a season, before signing with Nîmes Olympique in January 2011. In February 2012, he joined Slovak club FK Senica on a two-year contract.

References

External links

1985 births
Living people
Ivorian footballers
Association football forwards
Footballers from Abidjan
Liga I players
Slovak Super Liga players
Czech First League players
Indonesian Super League players
FC Politehnica Iași (1945) players
FC Brașov (1936) players
Nîmes Olympique players
FK Senica players
1. SC Znojmo players
PSM Makassar players
Expatriate footballers in Egypt
Expatriate footballers in Romania
Expatriate footballers in France
Expatriate footballers in Slovakia
Expatriate footballers in the Czech Republic
Expatriate footballers in Indonesia
Ivorian expatriate sportspeople in Egypt
Ivorian expatriate sportspeople in Romania
Ivorian expatriate sportspeople in France
Ivorian expatriate sportspeople in Slovakia
Ivorian expatriate sportspeople in the Czech Republic
Ivorian expatriate sportspeople in Indonesia